The Dance of Zalongo refers to the mass suicide of women from Souli and their children that occurred in the aftermath of the invasion of Ottoman troops on December 16, 1803. The event is commemorated in Greece in the context of the Greek War of Independence. A number of 60 women were trapped near the village of Zalongo in Epirus, modern Greece, then Ottoman Empire and decided to turn towards the cliff's edge and die with their infants and children rather than to submit to the Ottoman troops chasing them. According to tradition they did this one after the other while dancing and singing. The name also refers a number of Greek theatrical dramas and a song in folk style, commemorating the event, named "Dance of Zalongo" (Horos tou Zalongou).

History

During the Souliote War in December 1803, the Souliotes began evacuating Souli after their defeat by the forces of the local Ottoman-Albanian ruler, Ali Pasha. During the evacuation, a  group of Souliot women and their children were trapped by Ali's troops in the mountains of Zalongo in Epirus. In order to avoid enslavement and rape, the women threw their children first and then themselves off a steep cliff, committing suicide. The incident is also mentioned by Christoforos Perraivos in his 1815 edition of the History of Souli and Parga.  According to the legend, they jumped down the precipice one after the other while singing and dancing. The incident soon became known across Europe. At the Paris Salon of 1827, the French artist Ary Scheffer exhibited two Romantic paintings, one of which was entitled Les Femmes souliotes ("The Souliot Women"). Today, the Zalongo Monument on  Mount Zalongo in Kassope commemorates their sacrifice.

Theatricals and Songs
There is a popular Greek dance-song about the event, which is known and danced throughout Greece today. It was part of popular drama, written by Sp. Peresiades, published in 1903 and staged first in 1904. The Greek folk song "Dance of Zalongo" has the following lyrics:

Peresiadis describes this part of his drama as a "chorus of women", which can be translated as "dance", but in that context it possibly means a "group of women", as that in ancient Greek drama.

An Albanian dance-song called Vallja e Zallongut ("Dance of Zalongo") was developed with lyrics that refer to the same aforementioned mass suicide, published in 1961 by Sako Zihnni:

References

Sources

1803 in the Ottoman Empire
1800s suicides
Albanian folk dances
December 1803 events
Female suicides
Filicides
Greek dances
Mass suicides
Ottoman Epirus
Souliotes
Women in 19th-century warfare
Women in war in Greece